Food is the basic necessity of life for human beings as well as other animals.
Humans eat various food substances for getting energy,enjoyment and nutritional support. It is usually of plant, animal, or fungal origin, and contains essential nutrients, such as carbohydrates, fats, proteins, vitamins, or minerals. Omnivorous humans are highly adaptable and have adapted to obtain food in many different ecosystems. Historically, humans secured food through two main methods: hunting and gathering and agriculture. As agricultural technologies increased, humans settled into agriculture lifestyles with diets shaped by the agriculture opportunities in their geography. Geographic and cultural differences has led to creation of numerous cuisines and culinary arts, including a wide array of ingredients, herbs, spices, techniques, and dishes. As cultures have mixed through forces like international trade and globalization, ingredients have become more widely available beyond their geographic and cultural origins, creating a cosmopolitan exchange of different food traditions and practices.

Today, the majority of the food energy required by the ever-increasing population of the world is supplied by the industrial food industry, which produces food with intensive agriculture and distributes it through complex food processing and food distribution systems. This system of conventional agriculture relies heavily on fossil fuels, which means that the food and agricultural system is one of the major contributors to climate change, accountable for as much as 37% of total greenhouse gas emissions. Addressing the carbon intensity of the food system and food waste are important mitigation measures in the global response to climate change.

The food system has significant impacts on a wide range of other social and political issues including: sustainability, biological diversity, economics, population growth, water supply, and access to food. The right to food is a human right derived from the International Covenant on Economic, Social and Cultural Rights (ICESCR), recognizing the "right to an adequate standard of living, including adequate food", as well as the "fundamental right to be free from hunger". Because of these fundamental rights, food security is often a priority international policy activity; for example Sustainable Development Goal 2 "Zero hunger" is meant to eliminate hunger by 2030. Food safety and food security are monitored by international agencies like the International Association for Food Protection, World Resources Institute, World Food Programme, Food and Agriculture Organization, and International Food Information Council, and are often subject to national regulation by institutions, like the Food and Drug Administration in the United States.

Food sources 
Humans are omnivores finding sustenance in vegetables, fruits, cooked meat, milk, eggs, mushrooms and seaweed. Cereal grain is a staple food that provides more food energy worldwide than any other type of crop. Corn (maize), wheat, and rice account for 87% of all grain production worldwide. Just over half of the worlds crops are used to feed humans (55 percent), with 36 percent grown as animal feed and 9 percent for biofuels. Fungi and bacteria are also used in the preparation of fermented foods like bread, wine, cheese and yogurt.

Humans only eat about 200 out of the worlds 400 000 plant species, despite at least half of them being edible. Most human plant-based food comes from maize, rice, and wheat. Plants can be processed into breads, pasta, cereals, juices and jams or raw ingredients such as sugar, herbs, spices and oils can be extracted. Oilseeds are often pressed to produce rich oils - sunflower, flaxseed, rapeseed (including canola oil) and sesame.

Animals are used as food either directly or indirectly. This includes meat, eggs, shellfish and dairy products like milk and cheese. They are an important source or protein and are considered complete proteins for human consumption as they contain all the essential amino acids that the human body needs. Some cultures and people do not consume meat or animal food products for cultural, dietary, health, ethical, or ideological reasons. Vegetarians choose to forgo food from animal sources to varying degrees. Vegans do not consume any foods that are or contain ingredients from an animal source.

Fish and other marine animals are harvested from lakes, rivers, wetlands, inland waters, coasts, estuaries, mangroves, near-shore areas, and marine and ocean waters. Although aquatic foods contribute significantly to the health of billions of people around the world, they tend to be undervalued nutritionally, primarily because their diversity is framed in a monolithic way as "seafood or fish." Worldwide, aquatic foods are available every season and are produced in a wide variety. Over 2,370 species are harvested from wild fisheries, and about 624 are farmed in aquaculture. Fish powder for infants, fish wafers for snacks, and fish chutneys have all been developed because marine foods are nutrient-dense.

Taste perception

Animals, specifically humans, have five different types of tastes: sweet, sour, salty, bitter, and umami. As animals have evolved, the tastes that provide the most energy (sugar and fats) are the most pleasant to eat while others, such as bitter, are not enjoyable. Water, while important for survival, has no taste. Fats, on the other hand, especially saturated fats, are thicker and rich and are thus considered more enjoyable to eat.

Sweet

Generally regarded as the most pleasant taste, sweetness is almost always caused by a type of simple sugar such as glucose or fructose, or disaccharides such as sucrose, a molecule combining glucose and fructose. Complex carbohydrates are long chains and thus do not have the sweet taste. Artificial sweeteners such as sucralose are used to mimic the sugar molecule, creating the sensation of sweet, without the calories. Other types of sugar include raw sugar, which is known for its amber color, as it is unprocessed. As sugar is vital for energy and survival, the taste of sugar is pleasant.

The stevia plant contains a compound known as steviol which, when extracted, has 300 times the sweetness of sugar while having minimal impact on blood sugar.

Sour

Sourness is caused by the taste of acids, such as vinegar in alcoholic beverages. Sour foods include citrus, specifically lemons, limes, and to a lesser degree oranges. Sour is evolutionarily significant as it is a sign for a food that may have gone rancid due to bacteria. Many foods, however, are slightly acidic, and help stimulate the taste buds and enhance flavor.

Salty

Saltiness is the taste of alkali metal ions such as sodium and potassium. It is found in almost every food in low to moderate proportions to enhance flavor, although to eat pure salt is regarded as highly unpleasant. There are many different types of salt, with each having a different degree of saltiness, including sea salt, fleur de sel, kosher salt, mined salt, and grey salt. Other than enhancing flavor, its significance is that the body needs and maintains a delicate electrolyte balance, which is the kidney's function. Salt may be iodized, meaning iodine has been added to it, a necessary nutrient that promotes thyroid function. Some canned foods, notably soups or packaged broths, tend to be high in salt as a means of preserving the food longer. Historically salt has long been used as a meat preservative as salt promotes water excretion. Similarly, dried foods also promote food safety.

Bitter

Bitterness is a sensation often considered unpleasant characterized by having a sharp, pungent taste. Unsweetened dark chocolate, caffeine, lemon rind, and some types of fruit are known to be bitter.

Umami 
Umami has been described as savory and is characteristic of broths and cooked meats. Foods that have a strong umami flavor include meats, shellfish, fish (including fish sauce and preserved fish such as maldive fish, sardines, and anchovies), tomatoes, mushrooms, hydrolyzed vegetable protein, meat extract, yeast extract, cheeses, and soy sauce.

Cuisine

Many scholars claim that the rhetorical function of food is to represent the culture of a country, and that it can be used as a form of communication. According to Goode, Curtis and Theophano, food "is the last aspect of an ethnic culture to be lost".

Many cultures have a recognizable cuisine, a specific set of cooking traditions using various spices or a combination of flavors unique to that culture, which evolves over time. Other differences include preferences (hot or cold, spicy, etc.) and practices, the study of which is known as gastronomy. Many cultures have diversified their foods by means of preparation, cooking methods, and manufacturing. This also includes a complex food trade which helps the cultures to economically survive by way of food, not just by consumption.

Some popular types of ethnic foods include Italian, French, Japanese, Chinese, American, Cajun, Thai, African, Indian and Nepalese. Various cultures throughout the world study the dietary analysis of food habits. While evolutionarily speaking, as opposed to culturally, humans are omnivores, religion and social constructs such as morality, activism, or environmentalism will often affect which foods they will consume. Food is eaten and typically enjoyed through the sense of taste, the perception of flavor from eating and drinking. Certain tastes are more enjoyable than others, for evolutionary purposes.

Presentation

Aesthetically pleasing and eye-appealing food presentations can encourage people to consume foods. A common saying is that people "eat with their eyes". Food presented in a clean and appetizing way will encourage a good flavor, even if unsatisfactory.

Texture plays a crucial role in the enjoyment of eating foods. Contrasts in textures, such as something crunchy in an otherwise smooth dish, may increase the appeal of eating it. Common examples include adding granola to yogurt, adding croutons to a salad or soup, and toasting bread to enhance its crunchiness for a smooth topping, such as jam or butter.

Another universal phenomenon regarding food is the appeal of contrast in taste and presentation. For example, such opposite flavors as sweetness and saltiness tend to go well together, as in kettle corn and nuts.

Food preparation

While many foods can be eaten raw, many also undergo some form of preparation for reasons of safety, palatability, texture, or flavor. At the simplest level this may involve washing, cutting, trimming, or adding other foods or ingredients, such as spices. It may also involve mixing, heating or cooling, pressure cooking, fermentation, or combination with other food. In a home, most food preparation takes place in a kitchen. Some preparation is done to enhance the taste or aesthetic appeal; other preparation may help to preserve the food; others may be involved in cultural identity. A meal is made up of food which is prepared to be eaten at a specific time and place.

Animal preparation
The preparation of animal-based food usually involves slaughter, evisceration, hanging, portioning, and rendering. In developed countries, this is usually done outside the home in slaughterhouses, which are used to process animals en masse for meat production. Many countries regulate their slaughterhouses by law. For example, the United States has established the Humane Slaughter Act of 1958, which requires that an animal be stunned before killing. This act, like those in many countries, exempts slaughter in accordance with religious law, such as kosher, shechita, and dhabīḥah halal. Strict interpretations of kashrut require the animal to be fully aware when its carotid artery is cut.

On the local level, a butcher may commonly break down larger animal meat into smaller manageable cuts, and pre-wrap them for commercial sale or wrap them to order in butcher paper. In addition, fish and seafood may be fabricated into smaller cuts by a fishmonger. However, fish butchery may be done on board a fishing vessel and quick-frozen for the preservation of quality.

Raw food preparation

Certain cultures highlight animal and vegetable foods in a raw state. Salads consisting of raw vegetables or fruits are common in many cuisines. Sashimi in Japanese cuisine consists of raw sliced fish or other meat, and sushi often incorporates raw fish or seafood. Steak tartare and salmon tartare are dishes made from diced or ground raw beef or salmon, mixed with various ingredients and served with baguettes, brioche, or frites. In Italy, carpaccio is a dish of very thinly sliced raw beef, drizzled with a vinaigrette made with olive oil. The health food movement known as raw foodism promotes a mostly vegan diet of raw fruits, vegetables, and grains prepared in various ways, including juicing, food dehydration, sprouting, and other methods of preparation that do not heat the food above . An example of a raw meat dish is ceviche, a Latin American dish made with raw meat that is "cooked" from the highly acidic citric juice from lemons and limes along with other aromatics such as garlic.

Cooking

The term "cooking" encompasses a vast range of methods, tools, and combinations of ingredients to improve the flavor or digestibility of food. Cooking technique, known as culinary art, generally requires the selection, measurement, and combining of ingredients in an ordered procedure in an effort to achieve the desired result. Constraints on success include the variability of ingredients, ambient conditions, tools, and the skill of the individual cook. The diversity of cooking worldwide is a reflection of the myriad nutritional, aesthetic, agricultural, economic, cultural, and religious considerations that affect it.

Cooking requires applying heat to a food which usually, though not always, chemically changes the molecules, thus changing its flavor, texture, appearance, and nutritional properties. Cooking certain proteins, such as egg whites, meats, and fish, denatures the protein, causing it to firm. There is archaeological evidence of roasted foodstuffs at Homo erectus campsites dating from 420,000 years ago. Boiling as a means of cooking requires a container, and has been practiced at least since the 10th millennium BC with the introduction of pottery.

Cooking equipment

There are many different types of equipment used for cooking.

Different cuisines will use different types of ovens. For example, Indian culture uses a tandoor oven, which is a cylindrical clay oven which operates at a single high temperature. Western kitchens use variable temperature convection ovens, conventional ovens, toaster ovens, or non-radiant heat ovens like the microwave oven. Classic Italian cuisine includes the use of a brick oven containing burning wood. Ovens may be wood-fired, coal-fired, gas, electric, or oil-fired.

Various types of cook-tops are used as well. They carry the same variations of fuel types as the ovens mentioned above. Cook-tops are used to heat vessels placed on top of the heat source, such as a sauté pan, sauce pot, frying pan, or pressure cooker. These pieces of equipment can use either a moist or dry cooking method and include methods such as steaming, simmering, boiling, and poaching for moist methods, while the dry methods include sautéing, pan frying, and deep-frying.

In addition, many cultures use grills for cooking. A grill operates with a radiant heat source from below, usually covered with a metal grid and sometimes a cover. An open-pit barbecue in the American south is one example along with the American style outdoor grill fueled by wood, liquid propane, or charcoal along with soaked wood chips for smoking. A Mexican style of barbecue is called barbacoa, which involves the cooking of meats such as whole sheep over an open fire. In Argentina, an asado (Spanish for "grilled") is prepared on a grill held over an open pit or fire made upon the ground, on which a whole animal or smaller cuts are grilled.

Restaurants

Restaurants employ chefs to prepare the food, and waiters to serve customers at the table. The term restaurant comes from an old term for a restorative meat broth; this broth (or bouillon) was served in elegant outlets in Paris from the mid 18th century. These refined "restaurants" were a marked change from the usual basic eateries such as inns and taverns, and some had developed from early Parisian cafés, such as Café Procope, by first serving bouillon, then adding other cooked food to their menus.

Commercial eateries existed during the Roman period, with evidence of 150 "thermopolia", a form of fast food restaurant, found in Pompeii, and urban sales of prepared foods may have existed in China during the Song dynasty.

In 2005, the population of the United States spent $496 billion on out-of-home dining. Expenditures by type of out-of-home dining were as follows: 40% in full-service restaurants, 37.2% in limited service restaurants (fast food), 6.6% in schools or colleges, 5.4% in bars and vending machines, 4.7% in hotels and motels, 4.0% in recreational places, and 2.2% in others, which includes military bases.

Economy

 Food systems have complex economic and social value chains that effect many parts of the global economy.

Production

Most food has always been obtained through agriculture. With increasing concern over both the methods and products of modern industrial agriculture, there has been a growing trend toward sustainable agricultural practices. This approach, partly fueled by consumer demand, encourages biodiversity, local self-reliance and organic farming methods. Major influences on food production include international organizations (e.g. the World Trade Organization and Common Agricultural Policy), national government policy (or law), and war.

Several organisations have begun calling for a new kind of agriculture in which agroecosystems provide food but also support vital ecosystem services so that soil fertility and biodiversity are maintained rather than compromised. According to the International Water Management Institute and UNEP, well-managed agroecosystems not only provide food, fiber and animal products, they also provide services such as flood mitigation, groundwater recharge, erosion control and habitats for plants, birds, fish and other animals.

Food manufacturing

Packaged foods are manufactured outside the home for purchase. This can be as simple as a butcher preparing meat, or as complex as a modern international food industry. Early food processing techniques were limited by available food preservation, packaging, and transportation. This mainly involved salting, curing, curdling, drying, pickling, fermenting, and smoking. Food manufacturing arose during the industrial revolution in the 19th century. This development took advantage of new mass markets and emerging technology, such as milling, preservation, packaging and labeling, and transportation. It brought the advantages of pre-prepared time-saving food to the bulk of ordinary people who did not employ domestic servants.

At the start of the 21st century, a two-tier structure has arisen, with a few international food processing giants controlling a wide range of well-known food brands. There also exists a wide array of small local or national food processing companies. Advanced technologies have also come to change food manufacture. Computer-based control systems, sophisticated processing and packaging methods, and logistics and distribution advances can enhance product quality, improve food safety, and reduce costs.

International food imports and exports

The World Bank reported that the European Union was the top food importer in 2005, followed at a distance by the US and Japan. Britain's need for food was especially well-illustrated in World War II.  Despite the implementation of food rationing, Britain remained dependent on food imports and the result was a long-term engagement in the Battle of the Atlantic.

Food is traded and marketed on a global basis. The variety and availability of food is no longer restricted by the diversity of locally grown food or the limitations of the local growing season. Between 1961 and 1999, there was a 400% increase in worldwide food exports. Some countries are now economically dependent on food exports, which in some cases account for over 80% of all exports.

In 1994, over 100 countries became signatories to the Uruguay Round of the General Agreement on Tariffs and Trade in a dramatic increase in trade liberalization. This included an agreement to reduce subsidies paid to farmers, underpinned by the WTO enforcement of agricultural subsidy, tariffs, import quotas, and settlement of trade disputes that cannot be bilaterally resolved. Where trade barriers are raised on the disputed grounds of public health and safety, the WTO refer the dispute to the Codex Alimentarius Commission, which was founded in 1962 by the United Nations Food and Agriculture Organization and the World Health Organization. Trade liberalization has greatly affected world food trade.

Marketing and retailing

Food marketing brings together the producer and the consumer. The marketing of even a single food product can be a complicated process involving many producers and companies. For example, 56 companies are involved in making one can of chicken noodle soup. These businesses include not only chicken and vegetable processors but also the companies that transport the ingredients and those who print labels and manufacture cans. The food marketing system is the largest direct and indirect non-government employer in the United States.

In the pre-modern era, the sale of surplus food took place once a week when farmers took their wares on market day into the local village marketplace. Here food was sold to grocers for sale in their local shops for purchase by local consumers. With the onset of industrialization and the development of the food processing industry, a wider range of food could be sold and distributed in distant locations. Typically early grocery shops would be counter-based shops, in which purchasers told the shop-keeper what they wanted, so that the shop-keeper could get it for them.

In the 20th century, supermarkets were born. Supermarkets brought with them a self service approach to shopping using shopping carts, and were able to offer quality food at lower cost through economies of scale and reduced staffing costs. In the latter part of the 20th century, this has been further revolutionized by the development of vast warehouse-sized, out-of-town supermarkets, selling a wide range of food from around the world.

Unlike food processors, food retailing is a two-tier market in which a small number of very large companies control a large proportion of supermarkets. The supermarket giants wield great purchasing power over farmers and processors, and strong influence over consumers. Nevertheless, less than 10% of consumer spending on food goes to farmers, with larger percentages going to advertising, transportation, and intermediate corporations.

Prices

As investment

Problems

Because of its centrality to human life, problems related to access, quality and production of food effect every aspect of human life.

Nutrition and dietary problems 
Between the extremes of optimal health and death from starvation or malnutrition, there is an array of disease states that can be caused or alleviated by changes in diet. Deficiencies, excesses, and imbalances in diet can produce negative impacts on health, which may lead to various health problems such as scurvy, obesity, or osteoporosis, diabetes, cardiovascular diseases as well as psychological and behavioral problems. The science of nutrition attempts to understand how and why specific dietary aspects influence health.

Nutrients in food are grouped into several categories. Macronutrients are fat, protein, and carbohydrates. Micronutrients are the minerals and vitamins. Additionally, food contains water and dietary fiber.

As previously discussed, the body is designed by natural selection to enjoy sweet and fattening foods for evolutionary diets, ideal for hunters and gatherers. Thus, sweet and fattening foods in nature are typically rare and are very pleasurable to eat. In modern times, with advanced technology, enjoyable foods are easily available to consumers. Unfortunately, this promotes obesity in adults and children alike.

Hunger and starvation 
Food deprivation leads to malnutrition and ultimately starvation. This is often connected with famine, which involves the absence of food in entire communities. This can have a devastating and widespread effect on human health and mortality. Rationing is sometimes used to distribute food in times of shortage, most notably during times of war.

Starvation is a significant international problem. Approximately 815 million people are undernourished, and over 16,000 children die per day from hunger-related causes. Food deprivation is regarded as a deficit need in Maslow's hierarchy of needs and is measured using famine scales.

Food waste

Policy

Legal definition
Some countries list a legal definition of food, often referring them with the word foodstuff. These countries list food as any item that is to be processed, partially processed, or unprocessed for consumption. The listing of items included as food includes any substance intended to be, or reasonably expected to be, ingested by humans. In addition to these foodstuffs, drink, chewing gum, water, or other items processed into said food items are part of the legal definition of food. Items not included in the legal definition of food include animal feed, live animals (unless being prepared for sale in a market), plants prior to harvesting, medicinal products, cosmetics, tobacco and tobacco products, narcotic or psychotropic substances, and residues and contaminants.

Right to food

Food security

International aid

Food aid can benefit people suffering from a shortage of food. It can be used to improve peoples' lives in the short term, so that a society can increase its standard of living to the point that food aid is no longer required. Conversely, badly managed food aid can create problems by disrupting local markets, depressing crop prices, and discouraging food production. Sometimes a cycle of food aid dependence can develop. Its provision, or threatened withdrawal, is sometimes used as a political tool to influence the policies of the destination country, a strategy known as food politics. Sometimes, food aid provisions will require certain types of food be purchased from certain sellers, and food aid can be misused to enhance the markets of donor countries. International efforts to distribute food to the neediest countries are often coordinated by the World Food Programme.

Safety

Foodborne illness, commonly called "food poisoning", is caused by bacteria, toxins, viruses, parasites, and prions. Roughly 7 million people die of food poisoning each year, with about 10 times as many suffering from a non-fatal version. The two most common factors leading to cases of bacterial foodborne illness are cross-contamination of ready-to-eat food from other uncooked foods and improper temperature control. Less commonly, acute adverse reactions can also occur if chemical contamination of food occurs, for example from improper storage, or use of non-food grade soaps and disinfectants. Food can also be adulterated by a very wide range of articles (known as "foreign bodies") during farming, manufacture, cooking, packaging, distribution, or sale. These foreign bodies can include pests or their droppings, hairs, cigarette butts, wood chips, and all manner of other contaminants. It is possible for certain types of food to become contaminated if stored or presented in an unsafe container, such as a ceramic pot with lead-based glaze.

Food poisoning has been recognized as a disease since as early as Hippocrates. The sale of rancid, contaminated, or adulterated food was commonplace until the introduction of hygiene, refrigeration, and vermin controls in the 19th century. Discovery of techniques for killing bacteria using heat, and other microbiological studies by scientists such as Louis Pasteur, contributed to the modern sanitation standards that are ubiquitous in developed nations today. This was further underpinned by the work of Justus von Liebig, which led to the development of modern food storage and food preservation methods. In more recent years, a greater understanding of the causes of food-borne illnesses has led to the development of more systematic approaches such as the Hazard Analysis and Critical Control Points (HACCP), which can identify and eliminate many risks.

Recommended measures for ensuring food safety include maintaining a clean preparation area with foods of different types kept separate, ensuring an adequate cooking temperature, and refrigerating foods promptly after cooking.

Foods that spoil easily, such as meats, dairy, and seafood, must be prepared a certain way to avoid contaminating the people for whom they are prepared. As such, the rule of thumb is that cold foods (such as dairy products) should be kept cold and hot foods (such as soup) should be kept hot until storage. Cold meats, such as chicken, that are to be cooked should not be placed at room temperature for thawing, at the risk of dangerous bacterial growth, such as Salmonella or E. coli.

Allergies

Some people have allergies or sensitivities to foods that are not problematic to most people. This occurs when a person's immune system mistakes a certain food protein for a harmful foreign agent and attacks it. About 2% of adults and 8% of children have a food allergy. The amount of the food substance required to provoke a reaction in a particularly susceptible individual can be quite small. In some instances, traces of food in the air, too minute to be perceived through smell, have been known to provoke lethal reactions in extremely sensitive individuals. Common food allergens are gluten, corn, shellfish (mollusks), peanuts, and soy. Allergens frequently produce symptoms such as diarrhea, rashes, bloating, vomiting, and regurgitation. The digestive complaints usually develop within half an hour of ingesting the allergen.

Rarely, food allergies can lead to a medical emergency, such as anaphylactic shock, hypotension (low blood pressure), and loss of consciousness. An allergen associated with this type of reaction is peanut, although latex products can induce similar reactions. Initial treatment is with epinephrine (adrenaline), often carried by known patients in the form of an Epi-pen or Twinject.

Other health issues
Human diet was estimated to cause perhaps around 35% of cancers in a human epidemiological analysis by Richard Doll and Richard Peto in 1981.  These cancer may be caused by carcinogens that are present in food naturally or as contaminants. Food contaminated with fungal growth may contain mycotoxins such as aflatoxins which may be found in contaminated corn and peanuts.  Other carcinogens identified in food include heterocyclic amines generated in meat when cooked at high temperature, polyaromatic hydrocarbons in charred meat and smoked fish, and nitrosamines generated from nitrites used as food preservatives in cured meat such as bacon.

Anticarcinogens that may help prevent cancer can also be found in many food especially fruit and vegetables. Antioxidants are important groups of compounds that may help remove potentially harmful chemicals. It is however often difficult to identify the specific components in diet that serve to increase or decrease cancer risk since many food, such as beef steak and broccoli, contain low concentrations of both carcinogens and anticarcinogens.
There are many international certifications in the cooking field, such as Monde Selection, A.A. Certification, iTQi. They use high-quality evaluation methods to make the food safer.

Diet

Cultural and religious diets
Many cultures hold some food preferences and some food taboos. Dietary choices can also define cultures and play a role in religion. For example, only kosher foods are permitted by Judaism, halal foods by Islam, and in Hinduism beef is restricted. In addition, the dietary choices of different countries or regions have different characteristics. This is highly related to a culture's cuisine.

Diet deficiencies

Dietary habits play a significant role in the health and mortality of all humans. Imbalances between the consumed fuels and expended energy results in either starvation or excessive reserves of adipose tissue, known as body fat. Poor intake of various vitamins and minerals can lead to diseases that can have far-reaching effects on health. For instance, 30% of the world's population either has, or is at risk for developing, iodine deficiency. It is estimated that at least 3 million children are blind due to vitamin A deficiency. Vitamin C deficiency results in scurvy. Calcium, vitamin D, and phosphorus are inter-related; the consumption of each may affect the absorption of the others. Kwashiorkor and marasmus are childhood disorders caused by lack of dietary protein.

Moral, ethical, and health-conscious diets
Many individuals limit what foods they eat for reasons of morality or other habits. For instance, vegetarians choose to forgo food from animal sources to varying degrees. Others choose a healthier diet, avoiding sugars or animal fats and increasing consumption of dietary fiber and antioxidants. Obesity, a serious problem in the western world, leads to higher chances of developing heart disease, diabetes, cancer and many other diseases. More recently, dietary habits have been influenced by the concerns that some people have about possible impacts on health or the environment from genetically modified food. Further concerns about the impact of industrial farming (grains) on animal welfare, human health, and the environment are also having an effect on contemporary human dietary habits. This has led to the emergence of a movement with a preference for organic and local food.

History

See also

 Bulk foods
 Beverages
 Food and Bioprocess Technology
 Food engineering
 Food, Inc., a 2009 documentary
 Food science
 Future food technology
 Industrial crop
 List of foods
 Lists of prepared foods
 Optimal foraging theory
 Outline of cooking
 Outline of nutrition
 Right to food by country

References

Sources

 Aguilera, Jose Miguel and David W. Stanley. Microstructural Principles of Food Processing and Engineering. Springer, 1999. .
.
 Asado Argentina. About Asado Argentina. Retrieved from http://www.asadoargentina.com/about-asado-argentina/  on 2007-05-28.
 Campbell, Bernard Grant. Human Evolution: An Introduction to Man's Adaptations. Aldine Transaction: 1998. .
 Carpenter, Ruth Ann; Finley, Carrie E. Healthy Eating Every Day. Human Kinetics, 2005. .
 Davidson, Alan. The Oxford Companion to Food. 2nd ed. UK: Oxford University Press, 2006.
 Food and Agriculture Organization of the United Nations. The State of Food Insecurity in the World 2005. . Retrieved from http://www.fao.org/docrep/008/a0200e/a0200e00.htm  on 2006-09-29.
 Hannaford, Steve. Oligopoly Watch: Top 20 world food companies. Retrieved from https://web.archive.org/web/20090918101335/http://www.oligopolywatch.com/2005/10/06.html on 2006-09-23.
 Howe, P. and S. Devereux. Famine Intensity and Magnitude Scales: A Proposal for an Instrumental Definition of Famine. 2004.
 Humphery, Kim. Shelf Life: Supermarkets and the Changing Cultures of Consumption. Cambridge University Press, 1998. .
.
 Jango-Cohen, Judith. The History Of Food. Twenty-First Century Books, 2005. .
 Jurgens, Marshall H. Animal Feeding and Nutrition. Kendall Hunt, 2001. .
.
 Kripke, Gawain. Food aid or hidden dumping?. Oxfam International, March 2005. Retrieved from https://web.archive.org/web/20060714133231/http://www.oxfam.org/en/policy/briefingpapers/bp71_food_aid_240305 on 2007-05-26.
 Lawrie, Stephen; R.A. Lawrie. Lawrie's Meat Science. Woodhead Publishing: 1998. .
 Magdoff, Fred; Foster, John Bellamy; and Buttel, Frederick H. Hungry for Profit: The Agribusiness Threat to Farmers, Food, and the Environment. September 2000. .
 Mason, John. Sustainable Agriculture. Landlinks Press: 2003. .
 Merson, Michael H.; Black, Robert E.; Mills, Anne J. International Public Health: Disease, Programs, Systems, and Policies. Jones and Bartlett Publishers, 2005.
 McGee, Harold. On Food and Cooking: The Science and Lore of the Kitchen. New York: Simon & Schuster, 2004. .
 Mead, Margaret. The Changing Significance of Food. In Carole Counihan and Penny Van Esterik (Ed.), Food and Culture: A Reader. UK: Routledge, 1997. .
 Messer, Ellen; Derose, Laurie Fields and Sara Millman. Who's Hungry? and How Do We Know?: Food Shortage, Poverty, and Deprivation. United Nations University Press, 1998. .
 National Institute of Health. Food poisoning. MedlinePlus Medical Encyclopedia F. 11 May 2006. Retrieved from https://web.archive.org/web/20060928222906/http://www.niaid.nih.gov/publications/pdf/foodallergy.pdf on 2006-09-29.
 Nicklas, Barbara J. Endurance Exercise and Adipose Tissue. CRC Press, 2002. .
 Parekh, Sarad R. The Gmo Handbook: Genetically Modified Animals, Microbes, and Plants in Biotechnology. Humana Press,2004. .
 Regmi, Anita (editor).Changing Structure of Global Food Consumption and Trade. Market and Trade Economics Division, Economic Research Service, USDA, 30 May 2001. stock #ERSWRS01-1.
 Schor, Juliet; Taylor, Betsy (editors). Sustainable Planet: Roadmaps for the Twenty-First Century. Beacon Press, 2003. .
 Shah, Anup. Food Dumping (Aid) Maintains Poverty. Causes of Poverty. Retrieved from http://www.globalissues.org/TradeRelated/Poverty/FoodDumping.asp  on 2006-09-29.
 Simoons, Frederick J. Eat Not This Flesh: Food Avoidances from Prehistory to the Present. .
 Smith, Andrew (Editor). "Food Marketing," in Oxford Encyclopedia of American Food and Drink, New York: Oxford University Press, 2007.
.
 The Economic Research Service of the USDA. Global Food Markets: Briefing Rooms. Retrieved from https://web.archive.org/web/20170704104430/https://www.ers.usda.gov/topics/international-markets-trade/global-food-markets.aspx on 2006-09-29.
 United Kingdom Office of Public Sector Information. Food Safety Act 1990 (c. 16). Retrieved from http://www.opsi.gov.uk/acts/acts1990/Ukpga_19900016_en_2.htm#mdiv1  on 2006-11-08.
.
.
 United States Department of Agriculture, USDA Economic Research Service: The Economics of Food, Farming, Natural Resources, and Rural America. "Briefing Rooms, Food CPI, Prices and Expenditures: Food Expenditure Tables". Retrieved from http://www.ers.usda.gov/data-products/food-price-outlook.aspx  on 2007-06-06.
 Van den Bossche, Peter. The Law and Policy of the bosanac Trade Organization: Text, Cases and Materials. UK: Cambridge University Press, 2005. .
 World Food Programme. Breaking out of the Poverty Trap: How We Use Food Aid. Retrieved from https://web.archive.org/web/20060928075506/http://www.wfp.org/food_aid/introduction/index.asp?section=12&sub_section=1 on 2006-09-29.
 World Health Organization. WHO Global Database on Child Growth and Malnutrition.
 World Trade Organization. The Uruguay Round.  Retrieved from https://web.archive.org/web/20060822200650/http://www.wto.org/trade_resources/history/wto/urug_round.htm on 2006-09-29.
.

Further reading
 Collingham, E.M. (2011).  The Taste of War: World War Two and the Battle for Food
 Katz, Solomon (2003). The Encyclopedia of Food and Culture, Scribner
 Nestle, Marion (2007). Food Politics: How the Food Industry Influences Nutrition and Health, University Presses of California, revised and expanded edition, 
 Mobbs, Michael (2012). Sustainable Food Sydney: NewSouth Publishing,  
  The Future of Food (2015).  A panel discussion at the 2015  Digital Life Design (DLD) Annual Conference. "How can we grow and enjoy food, closer to home, further into the future? MIT Media Lab's Kevin Slavin hosts a conversation with food artist, educator, and entrepreneur Emilie Baltz, professor Caleb Harper from MIT Media Lab's CityFarm project, the Barbarian Group's Benjamin Palmer, and Andras Forgacs, the co-founder and CEO of Modern Meadow, who is growing 'victimless' meat in a lab. The discussion addresses issues of sustainable urban farming, ecosystems, technology, food supply chains and their broad environmental and humanitarian implications, and how these changes in food production may change what people may find delicious ... and the other way around."  Posted on the official YouTube Channel of DLD

External links

 
 
 Food Timeline
 Wikibooks Cookbook
 Food, BBC Radio 4 discussion with Rebecca Spang, Ivan Day and Felipe Fernandez-Armesto (In Our Time, 27 December 2001)

Food and drink
 
Food watchlist articles